Steve Belkin is an American businessman who is the founder of Trans National Group, travel and other services, especially to affinity groups. And a former owner of Atlanta Thrashers and Atlanta Hawks.

Biography
Belkin was born in East Grand Rapids, Michigan where he attended East Grand Rapids High School. He is of Jewish descent. Later he graduated from Cornell University in 1969 with a BS degree in industrial engineering, and later served on the Board of Trustees and was named Cornell Entrepreneur of the Year in 2004. He also finished Harvard Business School and earned an MBA in 1971. In 1973 launched his first business, marketing discount vacation packages to members of the American Nurses Association and essentially inventing what is now called affinity travel and affinity credit cards. Since then, he has founded 29 other companies, including Trans National Group in 1974. The companies currently affiliated with Trans National Group include Trans National Communications, TNT Vacations, TN Real Estate, TN Marketing, Charlesgate West Management and Belkin Family Lookout Farm in Natick, Massachusetts.

In 2004, he became the largest individual shareholder and principal owner of Atlanta Spirit, LLC; the group that owned the Atlanta Thrashers and Atlanta Hawks.

Belkin currently serves as a National Commissioner and Honorary Life Member of the ADL, on the Board of Overseers of the Museum of Fine Arts Boston, and a Trustee of the Sports Museum of New England. He lives with his wife Joan and two children in Weston, an affluent Boston suburb.

Recognition 
Throughout his career, Belkin has received several awards and recognition for his philanthropic endeavors.

 Temple Beth Elohim: Tikkun Olam Award, 2015
 Robert F. Kennedy Children’s Action Corps:  Embracing the Legacy Award, 2010
 Human Relations Services:  Community Service Award, 2009
 ADL:  Distinguished Community Service Award, 2003.
 Reach Out and Read National Center:  Literacy Champion Award, 2002
 New England Assoc. of Healthcare Philanthropy:  Distinguished Service Award, 2001
 Cornell University College of Human Ecology:  Alumni Award for Outstanding Volunteerism, 1998

References

External links
 NBA.com biography
 Harvard Business School biography
 Cornell University biography
 Steve Belkin is a True Entrepreneur
HBS Entrepreneurs Oral History Collection: Interview with Steve Belkin (2001)

Samuel Curtis Johnson Graduate School of Management alumni
Harvard Business School alumni
American sports businesspeople
National Basketball Association executives
National Basketball Association owners
National Hockey League executives
National Hockey League owners
Living people
Jewish American sportspeople
People from Weston, Massachusetts
1947 births
21st-century American Jews